Corliss Buchanan (July 26, 1889 – December 10, 1947) was an American football, basketball, and baseball coach. He served as the head football coach at Missouri State University (then known as Springfield Normal School) from 1910 to 1911. He was also the school's head basketball coach and head baseball coach.  Buchanan played college football at Georgia Tech in 1909 under head coach John Heisman.

References

External links
 

1889 births
1947 deaths
Basketball coaches from Tennessee
Georgia Tech Yellow Jackets football players
Missouri State Bears baseball coaches
Missouri State Bears basketball coaches
Missouri State Bears football coaches
Sportspeople from Chattanooga, Tennessee
Players of American football from Tennessee